Pythodorida or Pythodoris of Pontus (30 BC or 29 BC – 38) was a Roman client queen of Pontus, the Bosporan Kingdom, Cilicia, and Cappadocia.

Origins and early life
Pythodorida is also known as Pythodoris I and Pantos Pythodorida. According to an honorific inscription dedicated to her in Athens in the late 1st century BC, her royal title was Queen Pythodorida Philometor. Philometor means "mother-loving" and this title is associated with the Ptolemaic dynasty of Egypt.

Pythodorida was born and raised in Smyrna (modern İzmir, Turkey). She was the daughter and only child of wealthy Anatolian Greeks and friend to the late triumvir Pompey, Pythodoros of Tralles and Antonia.

Her maternal grandparents were the Roman triumvir Mark Antony and Antonia Hybrida Minor.

Queen
The successive marriages of Pythodorida illustrate how elite women, like Rome's client states, were shuffled around in the game of power politics. About 14 BC, Pythodorida married King Polemon Pythodoros of Pontus as his second wife. By this marriage she became Queen of Pontus and the Bosporan Kingdom. 

Pythodorida and Polemon had two sons and one daughter, who were:
 Zenon, also known as Zeno-Artaxias or Artaxias III, who became King of Armenia in 18 AD and reigned until his death in 35 AD
 Marcus Antonius Polemon Pythodoros, also known as Polemon II of Pontus 
 Antonia Tryphaena who married King of Thrace, Cotys VIII

Polemon I died in 8 BC, and Pythodorida continued as Queen of Pontus until her death. Pythodorida was able to retain Colchis and Cilicia but not the Bosporan Kingdom which was granted to her first husband's stepson, Aspurgus. She then married King Archelaus of Cappadocia. Archelaus and Pythodorida had no children. Through her second marriage, she became Queen of Cappadocia. Pythodorida had moved with her children from Pontus to Cappadocia to live with Archelaus. When Archelaus died in 17, Cappadocia became a Roman province and she returned with her family back to Pontus.

In later years, Polemon II assisted his mother in the administration of the kingdom. Following her death, Polemon II succeeded to the throne. Pythodorida was remembered by a friend and contemporary, the Greek geographer Strabo, who is said to have described Pythodorida as a woman of virtuous character. Strabo considered her to have a great capacity for business and that under Pythodorida's rule Pontus had flourished.

Ancestry

See also
 Bosporan Kingdom
 List of Kings of Pontus
 Roman Crimea

References

Further reading 
Macurdy, G., Two Studies on Women in Antiquity: Vassal Queens and Some Contemporary Women in the Roman Empire - Portraits of Royal Ladies on Greek Coins, Johns Hopkins Press, 1937; ASIN: B000WUFYY0

External links
 An Athenian Honorific Inscription dedicated to  Queen Pythodorida, which is displayed at the Epigraphical Museum (inventory no. EM 9573) in Athens, Greece

Rulers of Pontus
Queens of Pontus
Ancient queens regnant
Ancient Greek women rulers
Remarried royal consorts
Roman client rulers
1st-century BC women rulers
1st-century women rulers
1st-century monarchs in the Middle East